Pierre Van Halteren (24 February 1911 – 23 September 2009) was a Belgian liberal politician and burgomaster from Brussels (1975–1982). In 1979, he was the president of the Brussels francophone liberal party, the Parti Liberal until it was dissolved when the PL joined the PRLW to form the PRL.

See also
 List of mayors of the City of Brussels

Sources

 Leaders of Belgium
 Blauw in de grote Vlaamse steden ? (Dutch, liberal archive)

1911 births
2009 deaths
Mayors of the City of Brussels